Charles Burton Mitchel (September 19, 1815 – September 20, 1864) was an American politician who served as a Confederate States senator from Arkansas from February 18, 1862 until his death in 1864. A member of the Democratic Party, he represented Arkansas as a U.S. senator in 1861.

Biography
Mitchel was born on September 19, 1815, in Gallatin, Tennessee. He graduated from the University of Nashville, in 1833, and from the Jefferson Medical College in 1836; moved to Washington, Arkansas, and practiced medicine for 25 years. He owned slaves.  He was a member of the Arkansas House of Representatives in 1848; receiver of public moneys, from 1853 to 1856; unsuccessful candidate for election in 1860 to the 37th United States Congress. Mitchel was elected as a Democrat to the United States Senate, and served from March 4, 1861, until July 11, 1861, when he was expelled for support of the Confederacy. He was then elected to the Confederate States Senate at the first session of the Arkansas General Assembly and served until  September 20, 1864, when he died the day after his forty-ninth birthday. He was interred in the Presbyterian Cemetery, Washington, Arkansas.

See also
List of Confederate States senators
List of United States senators from Arkansas
List of United States senators expelled or censured

References

Further reading

External links

Charles B. Mitchel at The Political Graveyard

1815 births
1864 deaths
People from Gallatin, Tennessee
Democratic Party United States senators from Arkansas
Expelled United States senators
Confederate States of America senators
American Freemasons
Physicians from Tennessee
American slave owners
19th-century American physicians
19th-century American politicians
Thomas Jefferson University alumni
University of Nashville alumni
People of Arkansas in the American Civil War
Burials in Arkansas
United States senators who owned slaves